Chelicorophium curvispinum is a species of amphipod crustacean. It lives in salt, brackish and fresh water, and may reach  in length. It occurs in the Caspian Sea, the Black Sea and adjoining rivers, and in river systems emptying into the southern Baltic and North Sea.

References

Corophiidea
Crustaceans of the Atlantic Ocean
Crustaceans described in 1895